The SWAC (Standards Western Automatic Computer) was an early electronic digital computer built in 1950 by the U.S. National Bureau of Standards (NBS) in Los Angeles, California.  It was designed by Harry Huskey.

Overview
Like the SEAC which was built about the same time, the SWAC was a small-scale interim computer designed to be built quickly and put into operation while the NBS waited for more powerful computers to be completed (in particular, the RAYDAC by Raytheon).

The machine used 2,300 vacuum tubes.  It had 256 words of memory, using Williams tubes, with each word being 37 bits.  It had only seven basic operations: add, subtract, and multiply (single precision and double precision versions); comparison, data extraction, input and output. Several years later, drum memory was added.

When the SWAC was completed in August 1950, it was the fastest computer in the world. It continued to hold that status until the IAS computer was completed a year later. It could add two numbers and store the result in 64 microseconds.  A similar multiplication took 384 microseconds. It was used by the NBS until 1954 when the Los Angeles office was closed, and then by UCLA until 1967 (with modifications). It was charged out there for $40 per hour.

In January 1952, Raphael M. Robinson used the SWAC to discover five Mersenne primes—the largest prime numbers known at the time, with 157, 183, 386, 664 and 687 digits.

Additionally, the SWAC was vital in doing the intense calculation required for the X-ray analysis of the structure of vitamin B12 done by Dorothy Hodgkin. This was fundamental in Hodgkin receiving the Nobel Prize in Chemistry in 1964.

See also
 List of vacuum tube computers

References

 Williams, Michael R. (1997). A History of Computing Technology. IEEE Computer Society.

Further reading

External links 
 IEEE Transcript: SWAC—Standards Western Automatic Computer: The Pioneer Day Session at NCC July 1978
 Oral history interview with Alexandra Forsythe, Charles Babbage Institute, University of Minnesota.  Alexandra Illmer Forsythe discusses the career of her husband, George Forsythe. At UCLA he became involved with the National Bureau of Standards Western Automatic Computer (SWAC) until 1957, when the National Bureau of Standards closed its operation at UCLA.  Also discusses his founding of the Stanford Computer Science Department.
 Margaret R. Fox Papers, 1935-1976, Charles Babbage Institute, University of Minnesota.  collection contains reports, including the original report on the ENIAC, UNIVAC, and many early in-house National Bureau of Standards (NBS) activity reports; memoranda on and histories of SEAC, SWAC, and DYSEAC; programming instructions for the UNIVAC, LARC, and MIDAC; patent evaluations and disclosures relevant to computers; system descriptions; speeches and articles written by Margaret Fox's colleagues; and correspondence of Samuel Alexander, Margaret Fox, and Samuel Williams.
 MERSENNE AND FERMAT NUMBERS by RAPHAEL M. ROBINSON. February 7, 1954. From "The Prime Pages".

One-of-a-kind computers
Vacuum tube computers
National Institute of Standards and Technology
1950s computers
Computer-related introductions in 1950
1950 in California
Science and technology in Greater Los Angeles